Niochalas Horan is a retired hurler from County Meath. He played with the Meath intercounty team. He won a Kehoe Cup and the Leinster Junior Hurling Championship in the 90's , and 00's, and the All-Ireland Junior Hurling Championship in 2004. He won a Nicky Rackard Cup in 2008.

Football

Horan played football at minor and Under 21 level with Dunsany in Meath.

He has had success at club level with Kilmessan winning Meath Senior Hurling Championships in 2004 and 2008 and a Leinster Intermediate Club Hurling Championship in 2008.

He retired soon after his Leinster Intermediate Club championship success with Kilmessan citing family and work commitments as his reasons and decided he had achieved enough at top tier hurling!

References

Living people
Meath inter-county hurlers
Kilmessan hurlers
Leinster inter-provincial hurlers
1978 births